Carlos Salguero (10 June 1955 – 26 December 2006) was an Argentine professional football forward. He died aged 51 from cancer in 2006. He spent one season in the North American Soccer League, one in the United Soccer League and nearly ten in various indoor leagues. Salguero also coached the Buffalo Blizzard of the National Professional Soccer League for one season.

Career 
Salguero began his professional career with Boca Juniors In 1981, he moved north to play for the Calgary Boomers in the North American Soccer League. In the fall of 1981, he signed with the Kansas City Comets of the Major Indoor Soccer League. The Comets traded him to the Buffalo Stallions in exchange for Yilmaz Orhan and Zoran Savic. Salguero quickly proved his worth as he became the team's all time leading scorer over just two and a half seasons.  The Stallions left the league following the 1983-1984 season. In 1982, he was loaned to play in the National Soccer League with Toronto Italia. In an exhibition game against Glasgow Celtic of Scotland, he was the dominant force in the Toronto Italia victory. After the game, the President of Toronto Italia Rocco LoFranco stated that he had never seen an attacker create such havoc in a defense. This game will go down in the annals of Toronto Italia history as one of the best games that Salguero had ever played. That summer Salguero played for the Buffalo Storm in the United Soccer League.

In 1983, he played in the Canadian Professional Soccer League with the Hamilton Steelers. In August 1984, Salguero signed with the Kansas City Comets.  In the fall of 1986, Salguero jumped leagues when he signed with the Toledo Pride of the American Indoor Soccer Association. In the summer of 1987 he returned to play with Toronto Italia where he assisted in securing the Ontario-Quebec title by recording a goal against St-Leonard Corfinium. He also played in the 1988 NSL season with Toronto Italia.

After only one season in Toledo, he moved to the Fort Wayne Flames for the 1987-1988 season and the Indiana Kick for the 1988-1989 season.  In the fall of 1989, he signed with the Memphis Rogues.  The Rogues folded at the end of the season and Salguero moved to the New York Kick. In the fall of 1992, Salguero played one game for the Buffalo Blizzard in the NPSL.

Managerial career 
On December 31, 1990, the Kick named Salguero as the interim head coach.  He went 1-4 as a coach, and with the team at the bottom of the standings, he was both fired as coach and waived as a player. In 1990, he returned to National Soccer League to former club Toronto Italia where he served as a player-coach.

In February 1997, the Blizzard brought Salguero into its coaching staff.  On June 13, 1997, the Blizzard elevated him to head coach.  He took the team into the playoffs, but was fired in July 1998.

References

External links
 Profile at Historia de Boca Juniors
 NASL/MISL Stats
 NASL indoor Stats

1955 births
2006 deaths
Sportspeople from Mendoza Province
American Indoor Soccer Association players
Argentine footballers
Argentine expatriate footballers
Argentine Primera División players
Boca Juniors footballers
Quilmes Atlético Club footballers
Calgary Boomers players
Buffalo Blizzard players
Buffalo Stallions players
Toronto Italia players
Hamilton Steelers (1981–1992) players
Buffalo Storm players
Fort Wayne Flames players
Kansas City Comets (original MISL) players
Major Indoor Soccer League (1978–1992) players
Memphis Storm players
Canadian National Soccer League coaches
Canadian National Soccer League players
Canadian Professional Soccer League (original) players
National Professional Soccer League (1984–2001) coaches
National Professional Soccer League (1984–2001) players
North American Soccer League (1968–1984) players
North American Soccer League (1968–1984) indoor players
New York Kick players
Toledo Pride players
United Soccer League (1984–85) players
Argentine expatriate sportspeople in Canada
Expatriate soccer players in Canada
Argentine expatriate sportspeople in the United States
Expatriate soccer players in the United States
Association football forwards
Argentine football managers